Leslie Harvey Eyres (August 3, 1892 – February 26, 1983) was a tire merchant and political figure in British Columbia. He represented Chilliwack in the Legislative Assembly of British Columbia from 1937 to 1952 as a Conservative.

He was born in MacGregor, Manitoba, the son of Charles Eyres and Emily Turner, and was educated in MacGregor and Brandon. In 1922, Eyres married Adelia Sanford. He served three years in the Royal Canadian Air Force. Eyres was an alderman for Chilliwack City Council for 13 years. He served in the provincial cabinet as Minister of Railways, Trade, Industry and Fisheries. Eyres was defeated when he ran for reelection to the provincial assembly in 1952. He died in Victoria at the age of 90.

References 

1892 births
1983 deaths
British Columbia Conservative Party MLAs
British Columbia municipal councillors
People from Chilliwack